Claude-Nicolas-Guillaume de Lorimier (September 4, 1744 – June 7, 1825) was a businessman, officer in the British Indian Department, and political figure in Lower Canada. He was also known as Guillaume, Chevalier de Lorimier, Major de Lorimier, and by the Iroquois name Teiohatekon.

Career
Claude-Nicolas-Guillaume de Lorimier was born in Lachine, Quebec, Canada in 1744. He was the son of Claude-Nicolas de Lorimier de La Rivière, and served as a junior officer when the British took control of New France. Lorimier aided the British in recruiting native warriors during the American Revolution and took part in the defence of Fort St Johns (later Saint-Jean-sur-Richelieu). He was wounded during an expedition led by Major-General John Burgoyne into New York state in 1777.

In 1783, following his service during the American Revolution as one of the leading officers of "British Indian" warriors, he married an Iroquois woman by the name of Marie-Louise Schuyler and the couple moved to Kahnawake, where he became resident agent. Shuyler died in 1790. Claude was elected to the 1st Parliament of Lower Canada for Huntingdon in 1792. In 1793, Lorimier married Marie-Madeleine-Claire, the daughter of seigneur Joseph Brassard Deschenaux.

In 1801, Claude remarried a third time, this time to Iroquois woman and Kahnawake resident Anne Skaouennetsi (also known as McGregor or Gregory) with whom he had four children, including Antoine-George de Lorimier. Claude served as resident captain for the Iroquois forces at Caughnawaga during the War of 1812 and fought at the Battle of Châteauguay. One of his sons, Guillaume-François, was killed at the Battle of Crysler's Farm, and another, Jean-Baptiste de Lorimier, was wounded at the Battle of Beaver Dams. Lorimier was named deputy superintendent of the Embodied Indian Warriors in 1814. He died in Kahnawake in 1825.

Descendants
Claude-Nicolas-Guillaume de Lorimier's son George de Lorimier (1805–1863) was also known as Antoine-George de Lorimier and George Oronhiatekha de Lorimier. He was a merchant, a wealthy land owner and a ferry operator in Kahnawake. In 1835, George married Marie-Louise McComber. Stephen-Ambroise, attorney Albert-Emmanuel (Albert Oronhiatekha), Georges-Gervais, Joseph (Sose Ountiakase) and Jean-Baptiste (Sawakis Tahohenta) were five of their seventeen children. The first two still have many descendants in Montreal and the latter has descendants in places such as California, Delaware and Virginia. George de Lorimier lies buried under the Saint-Francis-Xavier Mission in Kahnawake.

The first image shows Claude-Nicolas-Guillaume. The second image is a portrait of his son, Antoine-George.

This is a picture of his son (and grandson of Claude-Nicolas-Guillaume), and Montreal attorney Albert-Emmanuel de Lorimier: http://www2.ville.montreal.qc.ca/archives/portraits/fr/fiches/P1267.shtm

External links
 
  

The stone house in which de Lorimier was born and lived in as a child is now known as the Museum of Lachine. Its web page can be accessed here: http://ville.montreal.qc.ca/portal/page?_pageid=3156,3579362&_dad=portal&_schema=PORTAL

The stone house which de Lorimier owned from 1795 to 1803 still stands as of 2009. Its full listing can be viewed here: http://www.historicplaces.ca/visit-visite/com-ful_e.aspx?id=4844

1744 births
1825 deaths
British Indian Department
Members of the Legislative Assembly of Lower Canada
People from Lachine, Quebec